Ponley  is a khum (commune) of Phnom Srok District in Banteay Meanchey Province in western Cambodia.

Villages

 Ta Vong
 Ponley
 Svay Sa
 Svay Khmau
 Kouk Ta Sokh
 Pou Roam Bon

References

Communes of Banteay Meanchey province
Phnom Srok District